Allyn Rachel (born Allyn Rachel Lichtenfeld) is an American actress, writer and comedian best known from a variety of national commercials that began airing in the United States in 2011. She co-created the web series Couple Time with her partner Patrick Carlyle, which was developed for FOX but was not ordered to series.

Life and career
Rachel was born in Baltimore, attended the prestigious Park School of Baltimore, and began performing at Maryland's Center Stage. She is a graduate of the Tisch School of the Arts at New York University.

In 2011, she was selected to perform in the New Faces Characters showcase at the prestigious Just For Laughs comedy festival in Montreal. Around that same time, Rachel began appearing in a number of heavily viewed national commercials (including spots for Toyota, eBay, McDonald's, Wal-Mart, IHOP, and Dish Network) which increased her profile

She co-created Couple Time (which seeks to portray the "weird things couples do when no one else is around") with her partner Patrick Carlyle and in 2012 they developed the web videos into a television series, which sold to FOX with Ellen DeGeneres serving as executive producer. The pilot was not picked up though and the series never went into production.

She is a regular performer at the Upright Citizens Brigade Theatre in Los Angeles.

She also voices the character of Bee on the internet show Bee and PuppyCat, created through Frederator Studios' Cartoon Hangover series.

Filmography

Film

Television

References

External links

American television actresses
Living people
21st-century American actresses
Tisch School of the Arts alumni
Actresses from Maryland
People from Pikesville, Maryland
Year of birth missing (living people)